Jeffrey Arthur Berlin (born January 17, 1953) is an American jazz fusion bassist. He first came to prominence in the 1970s as a member of the band Bruford led by drummer Bill Bruford.

Musical career
Berlin was born on January 17, 1953, in Queens, New York. He studied violin from 5 until 15 years of age, when he was inspired to play bass guitar after seeing the Beatles. He attended Berklee College of Music to study bass.

After session work with Patrick Moraz, David Liebman and Patti Austin, he gained widespread international attention in 1977 when British musician Bill Bruford handpicked him for his debut album Feels Good to Me. He played in Bruford’s namesake band until 1980. His Bruford bandmate Allan Holdsworth employed Berlin for his 1983 Warner Brothers album Road Games.

Berlin continued to record and tour throughout the 1980s, 1990s and 2000s.

On August 30th, 2013, Berlin married Gabriela Sinagra, a jazz singer and vocal coach from Rosario, Argentina.

Style and appreciation
In a review for his album Low Standards, Bass Musician Magazine said, "Anytime I mention [Jeff Berlin], there seems to be a ripple in the force and the wave of Berlin supporters or antagonists come to the surface and spout-off their opinions. No matter where you stand regarding Jeff's musical philosophy, no one can reasonably deny the simple fact that Jeff seriously knows his craft and is one of the major players of our time."

Berlin's playing style has been compared to that of Jaco Pastorius; however, Berlin has repeatedly stated his distaste for Jaco imitators.

Discography

References

External links
 Official site
 
Jeff Berlin Interview NAMM Oral History Library (2021)

Jazz fusion musicians
1953 births
Living people
American jazz bass guitarists
American male bass guitarists
Jazz educators
Berklee College of Music alumni
Musicians Institute alumni
20th-century American bass guitarists
20th-century American male musicians
American male jazz musicians
The Eleventh House members